Bellifreschi is a 1987 Italian comedy film directed by Enrico Oldoini.

The film is a farcical take on Billy Wilder's romantic comedy Some Like It Hot.

Cast

References

External links

1987 films
Films directed by Enrico Oldoini
1980s Italian-language films
1987 comedy films
Italian comedy films
1980s Italian films